Bardeh Rasheh or Bardah Rashah may refer to:
 Bardeh Rasheh, Baneh
 Bardeh Rasheh, Marivan
 Bardeh Rasheh, Sarshiv, Marivan County
 Bardeh Rasheh, Saqqez